William P. Williamson was an American college football coach. He served as the third head football coach at Kansas State Agricultural College, now Kansas State University.  He held the position for one season in 1898, compiling a record of 1–1–2.

Head coaching record

References

Year of birth missing
Year of death missing
Kansas State Wildcats football coaches